The 2019 Nordic Junior Artistic Gymnastics Championships was an artistic gymnastics competition held in Sweden. The event was held between 18–19 May.  The men's competition took place in Halmstad while the women's competition took place in Västerås.

Medalists

References 

Nordic
Nordic